Inside the Fire may refer to:

 Inside the Fire (album), a 1984 album by Rita Coolidge
 "Inside the Fire" (song),  a 2008 song by the American rock band Disturbed